The 1972 Brown Bears football team was an American football team that represented Brown University during the 1972 NCAA University Division football season. Brown finished last in the Ivy League. 

In their sixth and final season under head coach Len Jardine, the Bears compiled a 1–8 record and were outscored 301 to 172. Ken Cleplik and Bob Pangia were the team captains. 

The Bears' 1–6 conference record was the worst in the Ivy League standings. They were outscored by Ivy opponents 250 to 131. 

Brown played its home games at Brown Stadium in Providence, Rhode Island.

Schedule

References

Brown
Brown Bears football seasons
Brown Bears football